Crystal City Independent School District is an American public school district based in Crystal City, Texas.

In addition to Crystal City, the district also serves the communities of Chula Vista, Amaya and Loma Grande. The school mascot is the peccary (officially the "Javelina").

Schools
Crystal City High School (Grades 9-12)
Sterling Fly Junior High School (Grades 7-8)
Benito Juarez Middle School (Grades 5-6)
Lorenzo de Zavala Elementary School (Grades 2-4)
Tomás Rivera Elementary School (Grades PK-1)

External links
 

School districts in Zavala County, Texas